(in English, Scorched Negro) is a Norwegian film released in 2003, directed by Erik Smith Meyer and written by Stein Elvestad. Norwegian band Ulver provided the soundtrack. The plot revolves around two families living in a rural part of Norway. The main character is a young black man who wants to be a Sami.

External links

2003 films
Norwegian-language films
Swedish-language films
Sámi in Norway
Sámi-language films
2003 drama films
Norwegian drama films
2000s English-language films